Béatrice d'Hirson (fl. 14th century) was a lady-in-waiting to the French noblewoman Mahaut, Countess of Artois.

Family
Béatrice's sister Mathilde (or Mahaut) d'Hirson was also a lady-in-waiting to the Countess.

Béatrice's uncles were as follows:
 Thierry Larchier d'Hirson, Bishop of Arras
 Denis d'Hirson, treasurer to the Countess of Artois, then lord of Arras
 Guillaume d'Hirson, bailiff of Arras
 Pierre d'Hirson, attendant to the Countess of Artois

In fiction
Although an obscure historical figure, Béatrice is an important character in Maurice Druon's series of French historical novels, Les Rois maudits (The Accursed Kings). In the novels, she practices witchcraft and is adept with poisons. Les Rois maudits was adapted into two French television miniseries in 1972 and 2005, and Béatrice was played by Catherine Rouvel in the 1972, and by Jeanne Balibar in 2005.

References

14th-century French people
French ladies-in-waiting
14th-century French women